John Kruspe (born July 5, 1944) is a retired Canadian football player who played for the Montreal Alouettes, Ottawa Rough Riders and Hamilton Tiger-Cats. He previously played football at Waterloo Lutheran (now Wilfrid Laurier University). Laurier has inducted him into their Sports Hall of Fame twice, once in 1986 and then again in 2011. John was a member of the Ottawa Rough Riders team that beat out the Edmonton Eskimos during the 1973 Grey Cup Championship in Toronto at Exhibition Stadium. He returned to Ottawa from Hamilton with his wife Bonny Kruspe (Reading) and their son Jory upon retirement from the game. He would soon become a school Principal with the Ottawa Board of Education and have a second son Tyler.

References

1944 births
Living people
Ottawa Rough Riders players